Persiaran PKFZ is a major highway in Selangor, Malaysia. It is the only main route to Port Klang Free Zone (PKFZ).

At most sections, it was built under the JKR R5 road standard, allowing maximum speed limit of up to 90 km/h.

List of interchanges

Highways in Malaysia
Expressways and highways in the Klang Valley
Malaysian Federal Roads